Ron Griggs is an American politician and a Republican member of the New Mexico Senate representing District 34 since his December 11, 2012. He was elected to the seat in the November 6, 2012 general election but was appointed by Governor Susana Martinez to fill the vacancy caused by the resignation of Vernon Asbill days before the term ended. Griggs was previously Mayor of Alamogordo and owner of the Alamogordo Title Company.

Education
Griggs attended New Mexico State University Alamogordo and earned his BBA from New Mexico State University.

Elections

2012 
When District 34 Senator Vernon Asbill retired and left the seat open, Griggs ran in the June 5, 2012 Republican Primary, winning with 1,783 votes (57.5%) and won the November 6, 2012 General election with 9,647 votes (67.7%) against Democratic nominee Ellen Wedum, who had previously run for a New Mexico House of Representatives seat in 2006, 2008, and 2010.

2016 
Griggs announced he would run for reelection on February 29, 2016. In his reelection announcement, Griggs emphasized job creation and his success in obtaining capital funding for roads, public infrastructure, and other projects in his district.

References

External links
Official page at the New Mexico Legislature

Ron Griggs at Ballotpedia
Ron Griggs at the National Institute on Money in State Politics

Place of birth missing (living people)
Living people
Mayors of places in New Mexico
Republican Party New Mexico state senators
New Mexico State University alumni
People from Alamogordo, New Mexico
21st-century American politicians
1952 births